Alexandra Mueller (born 14 February  1988) is a former professional tennis player from the United States.

In her career, she won seven singles titles and 21 doubles titles on the ITF Women's Circuit. In July 2009, she reached her best WTA singles ranking of 280. In January 2019, she peaked at No. 130 in the WTA doubles rankings.

ITF Circuit finals

Singles: 10 (7 titles, 3 runner–ups)

Doubles: 37 (21 titles, 16 runner–ups)

External links
 
 

1988 births
Living people
American female tennis players
Tennis people from Pennsylvania
21st-century American women